Radhika Pandit is an Indian film and television actress. She has established a career in Kannada cinema as a leading actress.

Having worked in television serials such as Nandagokula, Kaadambari, and Sumangali, Pandit made her feature film debut in Moggina Manasu (2008), for which she was awarded the Karnataka State Film Award for Best Actress and South Filmfare Award for Best Actress. She won the latter award again for her performances in Love Guru (2009) and  Krishnan Love Story (2010).

She rose to fame starring in commercially successful films Hudugaru (2011), Addhuri (2012), Drama (2012), Bahaddur (2014) and Mr. and Mrs. Ramachari (2014).

Early life & education
Radhika Pandit was born in Bangalore Palace Nursing Home to a Goan mother and a Saraswat father, Krishna Pandit, who is a stage and film personality. They lived in the Malleswaram suburb of Bangalore. Pandit has a younger brother, Gourang. She grew up in her paternal grandfather's house in Malleswaram and continues to live there for "sentimental reasons" as he "had bought the house with all the money he had saved." 

Pandit did her schooling at Cluny Convent High School, Bangalore, and later pursued a Bachelor of Commerce (B.Com.) course at the Mount Carmel College, Bangalore.

Pandit aspired to become a teacher after completing a Master of Business Administration course. However, in 2007, during her final year in B.Com., she was persuaded by a friend to audition for a role in a Kannada language television serial, Nandagokula, directed by Ashok Kashyap. Pandit was offered the role without an audition. The same year, she appeared in another soap, Sumangali. When the former neared completion, her photos began circulating in local magazines, which were noticed by film director Shashank who was looking for a female lead for his film 18th Cross, and the makers of Moggina Manasu. She was cast in both films and began filming for the former first.

Personal life 
In a 2010 interview with The New Indian Express, she said that she, however, loves visiting the Chitrapur Math in Uttara Kannada, where she has her roots, as she "feel[s] good after spending some time" and "believe[s] there are positive vibrations there. Pandit met actor Yash for the first time at the sets of her tele-serial Nandagokula in 2007. They began dating after having worked together in films, but kept their relationship private for years and away from the attention of media, and got engaged in August 2016. They got married in December in a private ceremony in Bangalore. Their daughter was born on 2 December 2018. Post-marriage, Pandit participated in the work of Yasho Marga Foundation, a foundation started by Yash that aims to "extend a helping hand" to "farmers and the labourers". Their second child, a son, was born on 30 October 2019.

Career

Debut, breakthrough and success (2008–2011) 
Radhika faced the camera for the first time in films with the Kannada film 18th Cross in 2007. The film was temporarily stalled following its producer Chikkana's death, only to release theatrically in 2012. This was when she began filming with Moggina Manasu. She was cast as Chanchala, a college-going teenage girl, who with her three friends are faced with problems of ragging and irksome boyfriends. She was paired opposite Yash, who she had previously worked with, in the soap Nandagokula. Released in 2008, Moggina Manasu emerged as a critical success and Pandit's performance received critical acclaim. The reviewer for Rediff.com wrote, "Newcomer Radhika Pandit shines among the four, and is bound to go places." She won the Karnataka State Film Award for Best Actress and Filmfare Award for Best Actress.

Radhika's next role was in the Nagathihalli Chandrashekhar-directed romantic-drama Olave Jeevana Lekkachaara (2009), a film that deals with the deviousness of pseudo-intellectuals. She was cast as Rukmini opposite Balachandra (played by Srinagar Kitty), who cheats her under the influence of the misguidance of a pseudo-revolutionary lecturer. G. S. Kumar of The Times of India called her performance "classic and lively". Her second release of 2009 was Love Guru, a romantic-drama film dealing with unrequited love and misunderstandings in a corporate setting. She which she was cast as Kushi opposite Tarun Chandra in the film. Critics acclaimed her performance and called her "one of the best actresses to appear on the marquee in the recent times." G. S. Kumar wrote, "Radhika Pandit steals the show with her brilliant expressions, lively action and excellent dialogue delivery." She won her second Filmfare Award for Best Actress.

In her first release of 2010, Krishnan Love Story, Pandit collaborated with the director Shashank for the second time after Moggina Manasu. It film saw her play the role of Geetha, a happy-go-lucky girl belonging to a lower-middle-class family, who, for want of money suppresses her ambitions. Shruti Indira Lakshminarayana of Rediff.com wrote of her performance, "Radhika does a detour from her glam city girl image, but it is hard to miss the sophistication in her. She however comes out with a good performance in the second half." With the film, Radhika won her third Filmfare Award for Best Actress along with other awards. In Gaana Bajaana, she portrayed Radha, who gets involved in a romantic love triangle with Krish and Kuttappa (played by Tarun Chandra and Dileep Raj). On her performance, Y. Maheswara Reddy of The New Indian Express wrote that she "walks away with all honours." Pandit next appeared in a comedy-drama film, Hudugaru, a remake of the Tamil film, Naadodigal, in a brief role. She was cast as the only female lead alongside three parallel male lead characters. She played Gayathri, a foodie, the love interest of Prabhu (played by Puneeth Rajkumar). Her performance won her, her fourth Filmfare Award for Best Actress nomination.

Critical acclaim, further success and stardom (2012–2016) 
The year 2012 saw theatrical releases of six of her films. In the first, Alemari, a drama film based on real-life incidents, she portrayed the role of Neeli, a girl from a middle-class family who falls in love with Mohan, a milkman (played by Yogesh). Of her performance, IBNLive wrote, "Radhika Pandit is as brilliant as ever with her plain Jane looks and high voltage performance in emotional sequences." In Breaking News, a film that deals with commercialization of the media industry, she played the role of Shraddha, the cheerful daughter of the Karnataka Lokayukta, who intends on fooling around with a journalist, played by Ajay Rao. The film opened to mixed reviews, however, Pandit's performance received praise. Rediff.com wrote, "It is Radhika Pandit's superb and light-hearted performance that livens up the proceedings." In her next release, Addhuri, a romance film, she was paired opposite debutant Dhruva Sarja. The film and Pandit's performance received positive reviews from critics. India Today wrote, "[Pandit] ... has once again proved why she is regarded as one of the awesome talents in the industry. She charms the young hearts, but at the same time can make the audience emotional with her performances." The performance fetched Pandit her fifth Filmfare Award for Best Actress nomination among others.

Pandit's first film, 18th Cross released in August 2012, received mixed reviews; however, critics praised her performance in the role of Punya, the love interest of Jeeva (played by Deepak), who gets wrongly implicated in a murder case, framed by an underworld don. The Times of India wrote of her performance, "Radhika Pandit hasn't changed much since her debut movie and has given an excellent performance." She was cast as Kajal in her next film, Sagar, opposite Prajwal Devaraj, alongside Haripriya and Sanjjanaa, a film that critics, a "commercial entertainer". Daily News and Analysis praised Pandit's performance in the film and wrote that she "walks away with the honours." Her final release of 2012 was Yogaraj Bhat's Drama, a comedy film that featured an ensemble cast of Pandit alongside Yash, Sathish Ninasam and Sindhu Lokanath, the former three of whom play students of a government-owned degree college. The film and Pandit's performance as Nandini earned unanimous praise from critics. IBNLive wrote, "Radhika Pandit is superb as a performer and her beautiful looks and style have added a special charm to the film." She also co-sang a track, "Drama Hitavachana" in the film, which featured her rapping in parts.

In Kaddipudi, Pandit was cast as Uma, a junior artiste in films, opposite Kaddipudi (played by Shiva Rajkumar), a former underworld don who tries to renounce a life of violence, but in vain. Her performance as a girl from a poor family having lost her parents and living with her grandmother, and playing the love interest of Kaddipudi was received well. Muralidhara Khajane of The Hindu wrote, "Radhika Pandit excels and puts in a mature performance and brings dignity to the character." In her second release of 2013, she was cast opposite Sumanth Shailendra in Dilwala, a romantic film that opened to largely negative reviews. Pandit's performance was however praised by critics and she received her second nomination of SIIMA Award of Best Actress. She next starred in the romance film, Bahaddur as Anjali, the love interest of Ashok (played by Druva Sarja), a descendant of a royal family. G. S. Kumar wrote that she "wins your heart with her brilliant expressions and dialogue delivery." Despite having received mixed reviews, the film turned out to be a commercial success. Santhosh Ananddram's Mr. and Mrs. Ramachari saw Pandit work with Yash for the third time. She was cast as the girlfriend of a stubborn brat, played by Yash, who idolizes actor Vishnuvardhan and has an easygoing attitude towards life. Kumar felt that Pandit delivered a "winsome performance". The film emerged as a massive commercial success.

In her only release of 2015, the romance-thriller Endendigu, Pandit, paired opposite Ajay Rao for the third time, played the role of his wife with schizophrenic tendencies who foresees his death among other dreams. The film received mixed reviews, with her performance receiving praise. In the comedy Zoom, her first release of 2016, she played Nayana, an employee with an advertising agency who believes in doing her work with integrity and ethics. After an initial run-in, she falls for an employee of the rival agency. The film received mixed reviews from critics; Archana Nathan of The Hindu felt the film "was filled with crass double entendre jokes", and wrote that Pandit "can barely do much in the role she has been given." She was cast opposite Puneeth Rajkumar in Doddmane Hudga, a film centered around his character set in Hubli. Of Pandit's role, A. Sharadhaa of The New Indian Express wrote that she "adds measured amounts of ludic spirit and her double shaded character is carried out with much flair. She making unintentional mistakes in speaking the local language is entertaining." Later that year, she played Ananya in Santhu Straight Forward, pursuing a degree in architecture and compelled to commit to marry her cousin following a family tragedy. S. Viswanath of Deccan Herald felt that the film was "the film is watchable" only "due to the magnetic presence of Radhika Pandit" and added that "she lets her expressive eyes and silence eloquently speak about her distraught state." Thus with various role, she is counted among the most popular Kannada actress of all time and has won many accloades for her starring roles.

Break from acting (2017-Present) 
After her marriage with actor Yash, she took a break from acting to focus on her personal life. Radhika only appeared in the 2019 film Aadi Lakshmi Puraana, for which she received critical acclaim.

Filmography

Films

Television

In the media 
Pandit is considered one of the most versatile actresses in Kannada cinema. In a 2015 Bangalore Times poll, she was voted as one of the most popular actresses in Kannada cinema. In a 2016 poll conducted by Vijaya Karnataka, she was again voted the most popular actress.

Between 2013 and 2014, Pandit and Puneeth Rajkumar worked as brand ambassadors for Right to education in Karnataka, having been chosen by Sarva Shiksha Abhiyan. In addition to this, she has endorsed brands in the past such as KLF Nirmal Coconut oil and Orra Jewellery. She was a part of Gillette's Shave India Movement.

Awards and nominations

Footnotes

References

External links 
 
 

Living people
Actresses from Bangalore
Indian people of Kashmiri descent
Kashmiri people
Kashmiri Pandits
Indian film actresses
Actresses in Kannada cinema
Indian television actresses
Kannada people
People from Uttara Kannada
21st-century Indian actresses
Filmfare Awards South winners
Konkani people
Actresses in Kannada television
Year of birth missing (living people)
Mount Carmel College, Bangalore alumni